Trás-os-Montes is a geographical, historical and cultural region of Portugal

Trás-os-Montes may also refer to:

Places

Cape Verde
 Trás os Montes, Cape Verde, a village in the municipality of Tarrafal, on the island of Santiago

Portugal
 Trás-os-Montes Province, the 15th century historical comarca, later province/prefecture, of Portugal
 Trás-os-Montes e Alto Douro, based on Amorim Girão's published analysis, but modified by the 1936 Estado Novo government
 Alto Trás-os-Montes, a former NUTS III subregion of Portugal
 Terras de Trás-os-Montes, an intermunicipal community and NUTS III subregion of Portugal

Film
 Trás-os-Montes (film), a 1976 film by Portuguese directors António Reis and Margarida Cordeiro

Other
 Trás-os-Montes wine